Clarence A. Smith was the director of the Centers for Disease Control and Prevention from 1960 to 1962.

References

Directors of the Centers for Disease Control and Prevention
Eisenhower administration personnel
Kennedy administration personnel